When a work's copyright expires, it enters the public domain. The following is a list of works that entered the public domain in 2008. Since laws vary globally, the copyright status of some works are not uniform.

Entered the public domain in countries with life + 70 years
With the exception of Belarus (Life + 50 years) and Spain (Life + 80 years for creators that died before 1987), a work enters the public domain in Europe 70 years after the creator's death, if it was published during the creator's lifetime. The list is sorted alphabetically and includes a notable work of the creator that entered the public domain on January 1, 2008.

Entered the public domain in countries with life + 50 years
In most countries of Africa and Asia, as well as Belarus, Bolivia, Canada, New Zealand, Egypt and Uruguay; a work enters the public domain 50 years after the creator's death.

Entering the public domain in the United States 

In the United States, the copyright status of works extends for the life of the author or artists, plus 70 years. If the work is owned by a corporation, then the copyright extends 95 years.

Due to the passing of the Copyright Term Extension Act (Sonny Bono Copyright Term Extension Act) in 1998, no new works would enter the public domain in this jurisdiction until 2019.

See also 
 1937 in literature and 1957 in literature for deaths of writers
 Public Domain Day
 Creative Commons

References

External links
Public Domain Day gifts
PUBLIC DOMAIN DAY

Public domain
Public domain